LaClede Town was a mixed-income, federally funded housing project in St. Louis, Missouri. Located near St. Louis University, it opened in 1964. It incorporated a mix of housing types and had spaces dedicated to social interaction and artistic production. It was an intentionally diverse community with respect to residents' income and race/ethnicity. This experimental urban development was "cool, hip, cheap and populated by people committed to making integration work." It became an incubator for new music, dance, poetry and other arts, especially jazz. Loyal former residents began organizing reunions in 1997.

Eventually, LaClede Town became run down, and the complex was demolished in the late 1980s. Some of the Grand Forest Apartments, a part of LaClede town, still exist as student housing for St. Louis University. Berea Presbyterian Church, which was central to the community and predated the LaClede Town development, still stands.  However, it has been redesigned for commercial use.

See also
 Pierre Laclède
 Missouri History Museum

References

Further reading
  LaClede Town Reminiscence
 "Poets of Action" St. Louis Black Artists Group
 Ramin Bavar, "LaClede Town: an analysis of design and government policies in a government-sponsored project" (Master of Architecture Thesis, Washington University in St. Louis, 1995).
 Ellen Perry Berkeley, "LaClede Town: the most vital town in town," Architectural Forum, November 1968.
 Traveling Back to LaClede Town By Keri O’Brien
 Former LaClede Town residents Ike Willis and MWA architects

Public housing in the United States
Geography of St. Louis
Demolished buildings and structures in St. Louis
1964 establishments in Missouri
Residential buildings completed in 1964
Buildings and structures demolished in the 1980s